In mathematics, a Moufang set is a particular kind of combinatorial system named after Ruth Moufang.

Definition
 Each  normalises the family .

Examples
Let K be a field and X the projective line P1(K) over K.  Let Ux be the stabiliser of each point x in the group PSL2(K).  The Moufang set determines K up to isomorphism or anti-isomorphism: an application of Hua's identity.

A quadratic Jordan division algebra gives rise to a Moufang set structure.  If U is the quadratic map on the unital algebra J, let τ denote the permutation of the additive group (J,+) defined by 

Then τ defines a Moufang set structure on J.  The Hua maps ha of the Moufang structure are just the quadratic Ua . Note that the link is more natural in terms of J-structures.

References
 
 
 
  
 

Group theory